Queen of the Mist is a musical with music, lyrics and book by Michael John LaChiusa. Queen tells the story of Annie Edson Taylor. Produced by Transport Group Theatre Company, the musical first opened Off-Broadway in 2011.

Production
The musical was the inaugural show of Transport Group's 20th Century Project. The musical premiered Off-Broadway at The Gym at Judson on November 6, 2011 and closed on December 4, 2011. The musical received positive reviews.  The show received its UK Premiere at the Jack Studio Theatre in London, produced by Pint of Wine Theatre Company, on April 9, 2019 and closed on April 27, 2019.

Cast and crew

Off-Broadway 
The musical was directed by Jack Cummings III, with musical director Chris Fenwick, choreographer Scott Rink, assistant choreographer Megan Kelley, set design Sandra Goldmark, costume design Kathryn Rohe, lighting design R. Lee Kennedy, sound design Walter Trarbach, assistant set design Aaron Sheckler, assistant light design Robert Eshleman, orchestrations Michael Starobin, and wig design Paul Huntley. The band consisted of David Byrd Marrow (French horn), Chris Fenwick (keyboard 1), Susan French (Violin), Martha Hyde (woodwinds), Jeffrey Levine (bass), Mark Mitchell (keyboard 2), and Anik Oulianine (cello).

The cast was led by Mary Testa (Annie Edson Taylor) and Andrew Samonsky (Mr. Frank Russell) with D.C. Anderson (A New Manager), Stanley Bahorek (Mike Taylor), Theresa McCarthy (Jane), Julia Murney (Carrie Nation), and Tally Sessions (Man with his Hand Wrapped in a Handkerchief).

The musical was made possible by major support by the Shen Family Foundation.

Off-West End 
The musical was directed by Dominic O'Hanlon, with musical director Jordan Li-Smith and associate Connor Fogel, design by Tara Usher, costumer Lemington Ridley, sound design by Adrian Jeakins.  The production was produced by Blake Klein for Pint of Wine Theatre Company.

The cast was led by Trudi Camilleri (Annie Edson Taylor) and Will Arundell (Frank Russell) with Emily Juler (Jane), Emma Ralston (Carrie Nation), Tom Blackmore (Mike Taylor), Conor McFarlane (Man with his Hand Wrapped in a Handkerchief) and Andrew Carter (A New Manager). The band was conducted by Jordan Li-Smith, and consisted of Maude Wolstenholme (French horn), Connor Fogel (keyboard 1), Grace Buttler (Violin), Claire Shaw (woodwinds), Jack Cherry (bass), Ashley Jacobs (keyboard 2), and Hannah Thomas (cello).

The production was nominated for two 2020 Off West End Awards, winning for ‘Best Musical Director’ (Jordan Li-Smith).

The Original London Cast Recording is available to buy and stream.

Plot
In the early 1900s, in western New York State, at Niagara Falls, Anna Edson Taylor is a 63-year-old teacher. Needing money, she decides to become the first woman to go over Niagara Falls, and designs her own barrel. She is helped by her manager, Frank Russell. "Navigating both the treacherous Falls and a fickle public with a ravenous appetite for sensationalism, this unconventional heroine vies for her legacy in a world clamoring with swindling managers, assassins, revolutionaries, moralizing family, anarchists, and activists. Convinced that there is greatness in her and determined not to live as ordinary, she sets out to battle her fear and tempt her fate." The score incorporates turn-of-the-century themes. Anna attempts to take advantage of her fame on the lecture circuit, but that does not last. Anna dies in a nursing home at age 82, a pauper.

Musical numbers

Act 1
 Opening—Company
 There Is Greatness In Me—Anna Edson Taylor
 A Letter to Jane/The Tiger—Anna, Jane
 Charity—Panhandlers, Anna
 Glorious Devil/The Waters—Barker, Company, Anna
 The Barrel/Cradle or Coffin—Anna
 Types Like You—Mr. Russell, Anna
 Do the Pan! -- Company, Anna, Mr. Russell
 Floating Cloud/Cradle or Coffin Reprise—Rivermen, Anna
 Laugh at the Tiger—Anna
 On the Other Side—Mr. Russell
 Act One Finale—Mr. Russell, Company, Anna

Act 2
 The Quintessential Hero—Anna, Company
 Million Dolla’ Momma—Mr. Russell
 Expectations—Mr. Russell
 Bookings (Part One) -- New Manager, Company, Anna
 Break Down the Door—Carrie Nation, Company
 The Green—Anna
 Bookings (Part Two) -- Anna, New Manager
 Postcards—Company
 The Fall (Act Two Finale) -- Anna, Company

Reception
Ben Brantley of The New York Times said the show "moves forward with a steady, fixed intensity that makes it feel as if it never moves forward at all". Steven Suskin of Variety said LaChuisa "developed a reputation for shows that are more esoteric than involving", but that Queen "breaks the pattern", and also noted that the score was "intelligent" and "tuneful". Aubry D'Arminio writing for Entertainment Weekly referred to the show as "beautifully odd".

References

External links
 

2011 musicals
Biographical musicals
Niagara Falls in fiction
Off-Broadway musicals
Cultural depictions of American women
Cultural depictions of stunt performers
Cultural depictions of educators